James Tsai, also known as Tsai Jen-chien (born 27 October 1952) is a Taiwanese politician who served as mayor of Hsinchu from 1997 to 2001.

Political career
A cofounder of the Democratic Progressive Party, Tsai served on the National Assembly from 1992 to 1997, and was the DPP caucus leader throughout his term. The legislative body elected its first speaker and deputy speaker during its 1996 session. Tsai was nominated as the DPP candidate for the deputy speakership, and lost to Shieh Lung-sheng. Tsai was elected mayor of Hsinchu in the 1997 local elections. In October 2000, he became the first elected local government leader from Taiwan to visit China. The next year, Tsai lost his bid for reelection. He attempted to run for the position again in 2014, without the backing of the DPP, which expelled him for mounting an independent campaign.

Controversy
During his mayoral term, Tsai was one of many mayors accused of corruption, as he had charged United Microelectronics Corporation a "township chief tax" for community development funds.

Soon after leaving office, Tsai was caught in the Chu Mei-feng sex scandal, during which he was represented by attorney Hsu Wen-bin. Tsai and Chu had dated for four years, before the relationship ended in February 2001. Later that year, a sex tape of Chu and married businessman Tseng Chung-ming was released. Prosecutors believed that Tsai and spiritual advisor Kuo Yu-ling asked a detective agency about hidden cameras. Tsai was questioned by the Taipei District Prosecutors' Office in January 2002, and indicted on 7 February. However, Chu chose to drop the case against Tsai in June.

References

1952 births
Living people
Mayors of Hsinchu
Expelled members of the Democratic Progressive Party (Taiwan)
Taiwanese political party founders